The 2008 NCAA Division II men's basketball tournament was the 52nd annual single-elimination tournament to determine the national champion of men's NCAA Division II college basketball in the United States.

Officially culminating the 2007–08 NCAA Division II men's basketball season, the tournament featured sixty-four teams from around the country.

The Elite Eight, national semifinals, and championship were again played at the MassMutual Center in Springfield, Massachusetts.

Making a third consecutive appearance in the tournament final, Winona State (38–1) defeated Augusta State in, 87–76, to win their second Division II national championship and second in three seasons. 

The Warriors were coached by Mike Leaf. Winona State's Jonte Flowers was the Most Outstanding Player.

Regionals

Northeast - Waltham, Massachusetts 
Location: Dana Center Host: Bentley College

South - Lakeland, Florida 
Location: Jenkins Field House Host: Florida Southern College

Great Lakes - Allendale, Michigan 
Location: Fieldhouse Arena Host: Grand Valley State University

North Central - Winona, Minnesota 
Location: McCown Gymnasium Host: Winona State University

South Atlantic - Augusta, Georgia 
Location: Christenberry Fieldhouse Host: Augusta State University

† South Carolina-Aiken, despite being the #1 seed, was barred from hosting the regional due to NCAA edicts disallowing the hosting of NCAA championships in the states of South Carolina and Mississippi as a result of controversies over continued usage of the Confederate flag.

South Central - Stephenville, Texas 
Location: Wisdom Gymnasium Host: Tarleton State University

East - California, Pennsylvania 
Location: Hamer Hall Host: California University of Pennsylvania

West - Anchorage, Alaska 
Location: Wells Fargo Sports Complex Host: University of Alaska at Anchorage

Elite Eight–Springfield, Massachusetts
Location: MassMutual Center Hosts: American International College and Naismith Memorial Basketball Hall of Fame

All-tournament team
 Jonte Flowers, Winona State (MOP)
 John Smith, Winona State
 Tyrekus Bowman, Augusta State
 Garret Siler, Augusta State
 Lew Finnegan, Bentley

See also
2008 NCAA Division I men's basketball tournament
2008 NCAA Division III men's basketball tournament

References
 2008 NCAA Division II men's basketball tournament jonfmorse.com
 NCAA Division II men's basketball tournament Results

NCAA Division II men's basketball tournament
NCAA Division II basketball tournament
NCAA Division II basketball tournament